HTMS Similan (871) is a replenishment oiler (AOR) of the Royal Thai Navy. She was intended to support the aircraft carrier  and its escorts. Similan was constructed in the People's Republic of China at the Hudong Shipyard through a 1993 contract with the China State Shipbuilding Corporation. The ship was commissioned in 1996. At the time, Similan was the largest ship in the Thai navy and the largest naval ship exported by China.

The design is a flush-decked development of the Chinese Type 905 AOR resembling the French Durance; the builder referred to the design as Type R22T. Similan was a sister ship or the precursor to the later Chinese Type 903.

Design
Similan has two refueling stations on each side. Solid cargo is transferred by helicopter.

The ship was planned to be armed with Chinese weapons; four Type 76 twin 37 mm naval guns and the Type 341 radar were not fitted.

Career

References

Sources

Ships of the Royal Thai Navy
Ships built in China
1995 ships